Chamber of Commerce and Industry of Romania Building or CCIR Building is an office building located in the city of Bucharest, Romania. It stands at a height of 57 meters and has 9 floors, with a total of 9,450 m2 floor space.

External links

Skyscraper office buildings in Bucharest
2002 establishments in Romania
Office buildings completed in 2002